Sina Siegenthaler (born  27 September 2000) is a Swiss snowboarder. She competed in the 2022 Winter Olympics, in Women's Snowboard Cross.

She competed at the 2018–19 FIS Snowboard World Cup, 2019–20 FIS Snowboard World Cup,  and  2021–22 FIS Snowboard World Cup.

References

External links 

 Sina Siegenthaler of Switzerland competes in the Ladies' Snowboard Photo by Tom Pennington - Getty Images

2000 births
Living people
Snowboarders at the 2022 Winter Olympics
Swiss female snowboarders
Olympic snowboarders of Switzerland
21st-century Swiss women